Émile Arnaud (1864–1921) was a French lawyer, notary, and writer noted for his anti-war rhetoric and for coining the term "pacifism". Arnaud founded the "Ligue Internationale de la Paix et de la Liberté" (International League for Peace and Freedom) in 1861 and was elected its first president. In 1901 he codified his beliefs into a treatise entitled the Code de la Paix, outlining and defining the goals, political positions and methodology of the Peace movement in general. He described this new political movement as "pacifism", setting it up as a counterbalance to the belligerence of emerging political ideologies such as socialism and anarchism. He advocated humanism, charity and tolerance, non-violent conflict resolution and reaching mutually beneficial political solutions through establishing consensus. Emile was a speaker at the second Universal Peace Conference which was preceded by a service at St Paul's Cathedral

When France entered World War I in 1914 Arnaud volunteered for military service, even though over age, and ended the war with the Croix de guerre.

Publications
L'organization de la paix . Berne: Bureau international de la paix, 1899.
"Code de la Paix", in: L'Indépendance belge, 1901.
Le Pacifisme et ses détracteurs . Paris: Aux bureaux de la Grande Revue, 1906.

See also
 List of peace activists
 Pacifism

References

Imbusch, Peter; Peace and Conflict Studies: An Introduction. VS Verlag, 2006, p. 527, 
Mauermann, Helmut; The International Peace Bureau from 1892 to 1950. Silver Castle Science 284, Stuttgart (1990)

External links
 

1864 births
1921 deaths
19th-century French lawyers
French pacifists
French political writers
French political philosophers
19th-century French writers
20th-century French writers
20th-century French male writers
19th-century French male writers
French male non-fiction writers